Slank is an Indonesian rock band. It was founded in 1983 by teenagers in an alley street in Jakarta called Gang Potlot. The band is also known for its song which are often accompanied with political and socially conscious lyrics. It continues to be active and has received many awards from the Indonesian music industry.   Along with God Bless and Dewa 19, they are dubbed as one of the greatest rock bands in the history of Indonesian popular music.

History

Early years
Bimo Setiawan Almachzumi (Bimbim) created Cikini Stones Complex (CSC) in the early 1980s. The band covered Rolling Stones songs. In 1983 the band broke up.

Accompanied by his colleagues Denny and Erwan, Bimbim created the band Red Devil. For the guitarist Bimbim brought in Bongky Marcel. In December 1983 they changed their band name to Slank because they looked "selengean" ("rebellious" or "unruly").

The group's initial lineup consisted of Kaka (vocals), Pay (guitars), Bongky Marcel (bass), Indra Qadarsih (keyboards), and Bimbim (drums).

Mainstream success
Their first album, Suit-Suit...He-He, was not released till 1990. This album was an enormous hit.  Their subsequent success inspired the formation of other bands, such as Dewa. The album which featured the song "Memang" and "Maafkan" exploded in the market so they were rewarded BASF Award for best newcomer category. The album also seemed to slap the Indonesian music industry which at that time was still incessant Malay songs like Search's Issabella song. Solid rock and roll blues and a la SLank music finally got close to young people in Indonesia. Their distinctive style, ignorant, slengean, but friendly managed to attract the masses who were then still limited to a minority. 

In 1991, Their second album, Kampungan, achieved the same feat of success with their first album. The singles from this album "Mawar Merah" and "Terlalu Manis" were made in two versions. Fun and Sales. But strangely, it was precisely the song version of fun, which became hits and was often played. Here Kaka plays harmonica. In this village album, Slank included the song Nina Bobo.

In December 1993, Slank releases third album, Piss!, which is a play on the word peace. This jargon became a trend at that time. The hits single of this album are "Piss" and "Kirim Aku Bunga". Their first three albums, awarded by BASF Indonesia for Best Selling Albums on BASF tapes in each years of released.

1994, Slank released their fourth album Generasi Biru with the several popular hits likes "Generasi Biroe", "Terbunuh Sepi", and "Kamu Harus Pulang" entered into Indonesia's top charts. This is their first album that went multi-platinum status and once again awarded by BASF Indonesia for Best Selling Albums.

Their fifth album, Minority, was released in January 1996. It featured the single "Bang Bang Tut" on the market. On the album, Bimbim sang a song of his title entitled "Bidadari Penyelamat". There is no arrangement whatsoever, only Bimbim's voice.

Conflicts, various changes, and struggle
Slank was plagued by a number of defections, some involving personal issues, others having to do with internal tensions based around creative decisions. Since its inception, Slank's band members have changed frequently. Reasons have ranged from drug use and woman to money and differences in musical styles. The best line up of the band was Kaka (vocals), Bimbim (drums), Pay (guitar), Bongky (bass) and Indra (keyboards).While working on the sixth album, Lagi Sedih, Bimbim decided to fire Bongky, Pay and Indra. But there is also a mention that Bongky, Indra and Pay quit or resigned because of the behavior of Bimbim and Kaka who have been too severe in drug use. The split can actually be seen on their fourth album in the song "Pisah Saja Dulu". Bimbim even intends to disperse Slank. But a letter written in blood by a Slanker made him discouraged. Its contents are scary. "Don't be cheeky, Bim! If Slank breaks up, it means it's wrong! I wrote this letter using blood. Don't let me write the next letter using your blood!" Letters of threat and vows to kill Bimbim if it dissolves Slank is unavoidable. Kaka and Bimbim finally continued to work on their sixth album with the help of additional musicians. Reynold entered to fill the position of guitar and Ivanka who was often hanging out at Potlot also helped in working on the Slank project for the sixth album with the formation of this transition period. The album, Lagi Sedih, was released in February 1997. Single "Koepoe Liarkoe" and "Tonk Kosong" prove that Slank can still survive. Bid gig also arrived.

New formation and continue success
The entry of Abdee and Ridho, Slank continued his musical journey. The result was the album Seven which was released in January 1997 with reliable song "Balikin". The album sold one million copies in a matter of weeks. From there, more albums, most of them commercially successful, followed. The negativity was overcome, and over the next 20 years, Slank was able to increase their profile, tour the world and maintain commercial success. In 2007, Slank released their 20th album, Slow But Sure.

Slank became the first MTV Indonesia icon in 2005.

In 2007, Slank released the new album, Slow But Sure; the album's first single "Slalu Begitu" was played heavily on Indonesian radio stations.

In 2008 Slank toured the U.S. and Europe. They have also played in various Asian countries, such as Thailand, the Philippines, Japan, and South Korea.

Having more than fifteen albums sold and occasionally causing political controversy in Indonesia, Slank decided to travel to the US to record their first English-language album, Anthem for the Broken-Hearted. Blues Saraceno was chosen to be the producer of the album. They recorded and mixed the album in only twenty-two days.

“If you want the world to see what you want to say, you better go to the highest mountain. And for music, the highest mountain now is in the U.S.A.”, says Abdee Negara.

Java Jazz Festival 2009
In 2009, surprisingly, Slank was invited to take part in the well known Java Jazz Festival.

Their invitation to a jazz festival by Peter F. Gontha was meant as a challenge to see if they had what it took to perform in a jazz music setting. Their show, attended by thousands, successfully transformed their songs into jazz. In the spirit of reaching a greater jazz audience by combining genres, this show featured Michael Paulo, Ron King and Tony Monaco. It later was described as a "once in a lifetime experience".

Slankers
For more than two decades, Slank has managed a healthy attitude towards their music career, which in turn has helped them throughout the years. Slank has also gained somewhat of a cult status in Indonesia, Slank fans are known as 'Slankers', and they have a reputation for devotion. They wave their Slank flags, which consist of the word 'Slank' shaped into a graffiti-style butterfly. They sing along with several punk rock songs and perform a stadium-worthy call-and-response routine. According to one of the guitarists Ridho, 'Slankers' span all ages from children to adults.

Biopic
In 2009 Slank took part in a film called Generasi Biru that depicts their life and journey. It was directed by Garin Nugroho. For the film, Slank released a single, "Slank Dance", the video clip of which depicts members of the band performing a unique dance created by their fans, the Slankers.

Band members

Current members
 Bimbim – drums, percussion, backing vocals, guitar, vocals (1983–present)
 Kaka – lead and backing vocals, harmonica, tambourine, guitar, drums (1989–present)
 Abdee – lead guitar, backing vocals (1997–present)
 Ridho – rhythm and lead guitar, keyboards, backing vocals (1997–present)
 Ivanka – bass, percussion, backing vocals (1997–present)

Former members
 Denny BDN – bass (1983–1986, 1987, 1988), lead vocals (1986–1987, 1987–1988)
 Bongky – guitar (1983–1987), bass, backing vocals (1989–1996)
 Erwan – lead vocals (1983–1985)
 Kiki – guitar (1983)
 Adrian Sidharta – keyboards (1985–1986, 1988)
 Uti – lead vocals (1985)
 Well Welly – lead vocals (1986–1987, 1988)
 Andre – keyboards (1987)
 Pay – lead and rhythm guitar, backing vocals (1988, 1988–1996)
 Jaya – guitar (1988)
 Sammy – lead vocals (1988)
 Imanez – bass, guitar (1988)
 Anto – guitar, vocals (1988)
 Tole – bass (1988)
 Nita Tilana – lead vocals (1988)
 Indra Q – keyboards, backing vocals (1988–1996)
 Reynold – lead and rhythm guitar (1996–1997)

Discography

Studio albums
 Suit-Suit... He-He (Gadis Sexy) (1990)
 Kampungan (1991)
 Piss (1993)
 Generasi Biru (1994)
 Minoritas (1996)
 Lagi Sedih (1997)
 Tujuh (1998)
 Mata Hati Reformasi (1998)
 999 + 09, Vol. 1 (1999) (double album) 999 + 09, Vol. 2 (1999)
 Virus (2001)
 Satu Satu (2003)
 Road To Peace (2004)
 PLUR (2004)
 Slankissme (2005)
 Slow But Sure (2007)
 The Big Hip (2008)
 Anthem For The Broken Hearted (2009)
 Jurus Tandur No.18 (2010)
 I Slank U The Album (2012)
 Slank Nggak Ada Matinya (2013)
 Restart Hati (2015)
 Palalopeyank (2017)
 Slanking Forever (2019)
 Vaksin (2021)

Live albums
 Konser Piss 30 Kota (1998)
 Virus Road Show (2002)
 Slank Bajakan (2003)
 Reborn Republic Slank (2005)

Movie soundtracks
 O.S.T. "Get Married" (2007)
 Original Soundtrack "Generasi Biru" The Movie (2009)
 O.S.T. "Get Married 2" (2009)

International albums
 Since 1983 - Malaysian Edition (2006)
 Slank feat. Big Hip - Japan Edition (2008)
 Anthem For The Broken Hearted - USA Edition (2008)

Awards and nominations

See also
 List of Indonesian rock bands

References

External links
 Official site
 
 Slank discography at Discogs
 Slank at Last.fm
 Slank Guitar Chords at Chord Gitar

Musical groups established in 1983
1983 establishments in Indonesia
Indonesian hard rock musical groups
Blues rock groups
Anugerah Musik Indonesia winners
Megaforce Records artists